This article is intended to be a chronological list of books on diaries and journals, including how-to, self-help and discussions of the diary or journal as a genre of literature. For a list of fictional diaries, please see the list of fictional diaries. For a list of diarists, please see list of diarists.

A Life of One's Own by Joana Field (Marion Milner), 1934.
At a Journal Workshop by Ira Progoff, 1975.
The New Diary: How to use a journal for self-guidance and expanded creativity by Tristine Rainer, 1978.
The Creative Journal: The art of finding yourself by Lucia Capacchione, 1979*'
Ariadne's Thread: A collection of contemporary women's journals, edited by Lyn Lifshin, 1982.
A Book of One's Own: People and their diaries by Thomas Mallon, 1984.
The Journal Book, edited by Toby Fulwiler, 1987. (Collection of essays on using journals in K12 classrooms.)
Journal to the Self: twenty-two paths to personal growth by Kathleen Adams, 1990.
A Voice of Her Own:  Women and the Journal-Writing Journey by Marlene A. Schiwy, 1996.
How to Make a Journal of Your Life by Dan Price, 1999.
Keeping a Journal You Love by Sheila Bender, 2001.
Leaving a Trace: On Keeping a Journal by Alexandra Johnson, 2002.
The Decorated Page: Journals, Scrapbooks & Albums Made Simply Beautiful by Gwen Diehn, 2002.
Write for Life: Healing Body, Mind, and Spirit Through Journal Writing by Sheppard B. Kominars, 2007.
Narrative Journaling: 28 days to writing more or less happily for the rest of your life, by Charley Kempthorne,   2014
The Private Life of the Diary: From Pepys to Tweets by Sally Bayley, 2016.

See also 

Diary
Intensive Journal Method
List of diarists
List of fictional diaries
Literary technique
Notetaking

Diaries and journals
Diaries and journals
Diaries